Rose Hill Drive is an American rock band. The group is often aligned with other bands that are reviving traditional hard rock and early metal–psychedelic. Combining hard-driving rock and blues with modern touches and arrangements, they are often described by reviewers as reminiscent of 1970s rock bands Led Zeppelin and Cream.

History
Rose Hill Drive was formed in 2000 in Boulder, Colorado by brothers Jacob Sproul (bass guitar and vocals) and Daniel Sproul (guitar, backup vocals), and high school friend Nathan Barnes (drums). The present trio solidified after the departure of bassist Graham Webster, who later wrote about the band. The band takes its name from the street where the Sproul brothers lived and the band's early rehearsals took place.

Rose Hill Drive has performed with Stone Temple Pilots, The Black Crowes, The Who, Robert Randolph, Wilco, Queens of the Stone Age, Van Halen, Gov't Mule, The Answer and Aerosmith and also performed at Graspop, Bonnaroo, Wakarusa, Red Rocks, Austin City Limits and the Warped Tour.

First album
On August 22, 2006, the band released their debut self-titled album on Megaforce Records. That summer, the band played the same stage as The Who at the Wireless Festival in Leeds and the Hyde Park Calling Festival in London. In the fall of 2006 and spring of 2007, Rose Hill Drive supported The Who on select US and European dates. The band was joined on stage in Chicago at a taping of the show "In The Attic" by Pete Townshend, who jammed on The Who classic “Young Man Blues” and Rose Hill Drive's "Raise Your Hands".

In the April 2007 issue of Rolling Stone Magazine, Rose Hill Drive was named one of the "10 New Artists to Watch" in 2007.

Though influenced by many other blues and hard rock bands from the 1960s and 70s, the band reported in Rolling Stone that they are growing weary of being compared so closely to other bands, as they want to be known for their sound, not how much they sound like somebody else.

Their song "Goal!" is the official anthem for the Colorado Rapids of Major League Soccer.

Second album
The second album, Moon is the New Earth, was released on June 24, 2008, showing a blend of classic rock, punk-rock, psychedelia and even pop. The single "Sneak Out" appears in the popular video game Guitar Hero 5, released on September 1, 2009.

Return after hiatus
After a 17-months hiatus, the band was resurrected in June 2010 to play a free concert in native Boulder, Colorado, with a revised line up: new member Jimmy Stofer was added on bass, while Jacob Sproul switched to rhythm guitar in order to let his brother Daniel concentrate on lead work. In an interview they said they had been writing new material, but without being in a rush to make a new album anytime soon.

The band published two new songs on their Myspace.com web page in September 2010, named 'Setting Sun' and 'Mr Right'. In February 2011 Rose Hill Drive went into the studio and recorded a new album, and announced on their website a new US tour supporting Stone Temple Pilots through April and May. After a respite in June, Rose Hill Drive returned to touring in July 2011 with 15 more shows, opening for Stone Temple Pilots as well as headlining their own events.

On June 12, 2011, the band released their new album, titled "Americana", on their new self-founded label "Slow and Shirley Records", with two tracks published on Facebook to listen to and download.

Their fourth album "Mania" was released on March 9, 2017 with a live show at the Fox Theatre.

Discography

Studio albums

Live albums, EPs and Single Play

Compilations

See also
Music of Colorado

References

External links
Official Rose Hill Drive site
Rose Hill Drive collection at the Internet Archive's live music archive
Earvolution Interview/Profile

2003 establishments in Colorado
Culture of Boulder, Colorado
Indie rock musical groups from Colorado
Musical groups established in 2003